Glycoprotein Ib (platelet), beta polypeptide (GP1BB) also known as CD42c (Cluster of Differentiation 42c), is a protein that in humans is encoded by the GP1BB gene.

Function 

Platelet glycoprotein Ib (GPIb) is a heterodimeric transmembrane protein consisting of a disulfide-linked 140 kD alpha chain and 22 kD beta chain. It is part of the Glycoprotein Ib-IX-V Receptor Complex (GPIb-V-IX) system that constitutes the receptor for von Willebrand factor (VWF), and mediates platelet adhesion in the arterial circulation. GPIb alpha chain provides the VWF binding site, and GPIb beta contributes to surface expression of the receptor and participates in transmembrane signaling through phosphorylation of its intracellular domain. Mutations in the GPIb beta subunit have been associated with Bernard–Soulier syndrome, velocardiofacial syndrome and giant platelet disorder. The 206 amino acid precursor of GPIb beta is synthesized from a 1.0 kb mRNA expressed in plateletes and megakaryocytes. A 411 amino acid protein arising from a longer, unspliced transcript in endothelial cells has been described; however, the authenticity of this product has been questioned. Yet another less abundant GPIb beta mRNA species of 3.5 kb, expressed in nonhematopoietic tissues such as endothelium, brain and heart, was shown to result from inefficient usage of a non-consensus polyA signal within a separate gene (septin 5) located upstream of this gene. In the absence of polyadenylation from its own imperfect site, the septin 5 gene uses the consensus polyA signal of this gene.

Interactions 

GP1BB has been shown to interact with YWHAZ.

See also 
 Cluster of differentiation

References

Further reading

External links 
 
 PDBe-KB provides an overview of all the structure information available in the PDB for Human Platelet glycoprotein Ib beta chain (GP1BB)

Clusters of differentiation